Susan Banda  (born 6 July 1990) is a Zambian footballer who plays as a midfielder for the Zambia women's national football team. She was part of the team at the 2014 African Women's Championship. On club level she played for Red Arrows F.C. in Zambia.

References

1990 births
Living people
Zambian women's footballers
Zambia women's international footballers
Place of birth missing (living people)
Women's association football midfielders
Red Arrows F.C. players